Shadows is an album by American pianist David Benoit released in 1991, recorded for the GRP label. The album reached #2 on Billboards Contemporary Jazz chart.

Track listing
All tracks composed by David Benoit and Marcel East; except where indicated
"Overture" - 1:31
"Over the Edge" - 5:37
"Have You Forgotten (Interlude)" (David Benoit) - 1:07
"Shadows" - 7:05
"Saudade"  (David Benoit) - 3:46
"Moments" (David Benoit, Marcel East, Valerie Pinkston) - 4:48
"Already There" (David Benoit) - 3:39
"Still Standing" (David Benoit, Marcel East, Nathan East) - 5:11
"Castles" - 4:24
"Have You Forgotten" (David Benoit) - 4:19
"Reprise" - 1:38

 Personnel 
 David Benoit – synthesizers (1, 2, 4-7, 9),  arrangements (1), orchestration and conductor (1), Yamaha MIDI grand piano (2, 4-10), horn arrangements (2, 8), rhythm arrangements (2, 8), guitar (3), string arrangements and conductor (3, 4, 7, 8, 10), electric piano (6), acoustic piano (11)
 Marcel East – arrangements (1), synthesizers (2, 4, 6, 8), drum and percussion programming (2, 6, 8), horn arrangements (2, 8), rhythm arrangements (2, 4, 8), percussion (3), guitar (6), vocal arrangements (6), string arrangements (8)
 Pat Kelly – guitar (7, 9)
 Neil Stubenhaus – bass (2)
 Nathan East – bass (4, 9)
 Jimmy Johnson – bass (7), fretless bass (10)
 John Robinson – drums (2, 6, 8)
 Jeff Porcaro – drums (4, 5, 7, 9, 10)
 Michael Fisher – percussion (1, 3, 8, 9, 10)
 Chris Trujillo – percussion (4, 5, 7, 10)
 Tommy Aros – percussion (5, 7)
 Michael Paulo – saxophones (2, 8), soprano sax solo (4)
 Ray Brown – trumpet (2)
 Michael "Patches" Stewart – trumpet (2), flugelhorn (2), trumpet solo (4)
 Freddie Hubbard – flugelhorn solo (5), trumpet solo (8)
 Valerie Pinkston – vocals (2), lead and backing vocals (6), vocal arrangements (6)
 Dori Caymmi – voice (3, 5), guitar (5), vocals (10)The Shadows Symphony Orchestra 
 Bruce Dukov – concertmaster 
 Suzie Katayama – contractor 
 Chuck Domanico – bass (1)
 Larry Corbett and Suzie Katayama – cello (1, 3, 4, 7, 8, 10)
 Sally Bonebreak – French horn (1)
 Amy Shulman – harp (1, 3, 4, 7, 8, 10)
 Roland Kato and Ray Tischer – viola (1, 3, 4, 7, 8, 10)
 Joel Derouin, Bruce Dukov, Henry Ferber, Patricia Ann Johnson, Peter Kent, Sid Page, Michele Richards and Jay Rosen – violin (1, 3, 4, 7, 8, 10)

 Production 
 Marcel East – producer, additional engineer
 David Benoit – co-producer
 Dave Grusin – executive producer 
 Larry Rosen – executive producer
 Clark Germain – recording engineer, strings engineer, mixing 
 Khaliq Glover – recording engineer 
 Rik Pekkonen – recording engineer
 John Paterno – additional engineer
 Rick Winquest – assistant engineer 
 Dan Bosworth – mix assistant 
 Noel Hazen – mix assistant 
 Bernie Grundman – mastering 
 Ken Gruberman – music preparation
 Suzie Katayama – music preparation 
 Michelle Lewis – production coordinator 
 Andy Baltimore – creative director 
 David Gibb – graphic design 
 Scott Johnson – graphic design 
 Sonny Mediana – graphic design 
 Andy Ruggirello – graphic design 
 Dan Serrano – graphic design 
 Carol Weinberg – photographyStudios'
 Overdubbed at The Review Room (New York City, New York).
 Mixed at Ocean Way Recording (Hollywood, California).
 Mastered at Bernie Grundman Mastering (Hollywood, California).

Charts

References

External links
David Benoit-Shadows at Discogs

1991 albums
GRP Records albums
David Benoit (musician) albums